Catastrophe is a 1977 American documentary film that is written and directed by Larry Savadove and narrated by actor William Conrad about natural and man-made disasters.

Disasters featured
 The footage of the Hindenburg disaster in 1937.
 The tornado that hit Xenia, Ohio in 1974
 Hurricane Camille in 1969.
 The Dust Bowl during the Great Depression
 The 1974 Joelma fire in Brazil.
 The eruption of Mount Etna in Italy in 1971.
 The sinking of the SS Andrea Doria in 1956.
 The accidents during the 1973 Indianapolis 500.

Release

Theatrical
Catastrophe premiered in Tucson, Arizona on April 20, 1977, and later received a wide release in the United States in February 1978.

Home media
In 1987, Embassy Home Entertainment (later renamed as Nelson Entertainment) released the film on VHS.

Television broadcasts
The film premiered on premium cable network Home Box Office (HBO) in March 1979.

The film aired on the superstation feed of Chicago independent station WGN-TV in 1992.

References

External links
 
 
 
 
 

1977 films
1977 documentary films
American documentary films
American independent films
1977 independent films
New World Pictures films
Documentary films about disasters
1970s English-language films
1970s American films